Gerhardsen's First Cabinet, often called the Unification Cabinet, was a Norwegian government appointed to serve under Prime Minister Einar Gerhardsen between 25 June and 5 November 1945, in the aftermath of the Second World War.

The preceding Nygaardsvold's Cabinet had been appointed nine years earlier, but in 1940, just before scheduled elections, Norway was invaded by Germany, and the government had to flee to London. When the war was over, Nygaardsvold's Cabinet abdicated after returning to Norway, and a panpolitical, coalition government was appointed by King Haakon VII to sit until an election for the Parliament of Norway could be held.

The cabinet is noteworthy in Norwegian political history for being the first one to include a woman, Kirsten Hansteen, who was Consultative Councillor of State in the Ministry of Social Affairs, the only one ever to have members from the Communist Party of Norway (one of whom was Hansteen), and the only time the Labour Party sat in a coalition government before Stoltenberg's Second Cabinet was appointed in 2005.

Cabinet
The cabinet had the following members:

References

Cabinet of Norway
Cabinets involving the Centre Party (Norway)
Cabinets involving the Communist Party of Norway
Cabinets involving the Conservative Party (Norway)
Cabinets involving the Liberal Party (Norway)
Cabinets involving the Labour Party (Norway)
1945 establishments in Norway
1945 disestablishments in Norway
Cabinets established in 1945
Cabinets disestablished in 1945